is an East Japan Railway Company (JR East) railway station located in the city of Takizawa, Iwate Prefecture, Japan.

Lines
Koiwai Station is served by the Tazawako Line, and is located 10.5 km from the terminus of the line at Morioka Station.

Station layout
Koiwai Station has a two opposed side platforms, connected to the wooden station building by a footbridge. The station is staffed.

Platforms

History
Koiwai Station opened on June 25, 1921. The station was absorbed into the JR East network upon the privatization of the JNR on April 1, 1987.

Passenger statistics
In fiscal 2015, the station was used by an average of 496 passengers daily (boarding passengers only).

Surrounding area
  National Route 46
 Koiwai Post Office
Amihari Onsen
Iwate College of Nursing
Tsunagi Onsen

See also
 List of Railway Stations in Japan

References

External links

  

Railway stations in Iwate Prefecture
Takizawa, Iwate
Tazawako Line
Railway stations in Japan opened in 1921
Stations of East Japan Railway Company